Tudno was a saint in Llandudno, Wales.

Tudno may also refer to:

Tudno (electoral ward), a district of Llandudno
Tudno FM, a radio station serving Llandudno